Events from the year 1769 in Great Britain. This year sees several key events in the Industrial Revolution.

Incumbents
 Monarch – George III
 Prime Minister – Augustus FitzRoy, 3rd Duke of Grafton (Whig)
 Parliament – 13th

Events
 21 January – first of the Letters of Junius, criticising the government, appears in the Public Advertiser.
 February–April – John Wilkes is expelled from Parliament three times.
 23 March – Augustus FitzRoy, 3rd Duke of Grafton, the Prime Minister, and his wife, Anne, are divorced; on 24 June the Duke remarries.
 8 April – the Theatre Royal, York, reopens under this title having been granted a Royal Patent. (The manager, Tate Wilkinson, also obtains a patent for his theatre in Hull.)
 13 April – first voyage of James Cook: James Cook arrives in Tahiti on the ship HM Bark Endeavour, preparing to observe the transit of the planet Venus, which takes place on 3 June. After the voyage, the data is found to be inaccurate in determining the distance between the Sun and Earth.
 25 April–27 May – first Royal Academy summer exhibition held.
 29 April – James Watt is granted a British patent for "A method of lessening the consumption of steam in steam engines" – the separate condenser, a key improvement (first devised by Watt in 1765) which stimulates the Industrial Revolution.
 3 & 29 May – Eclipse runs his first races, giving rise to the phrase "Eclipse first and the rest nowhere."
 13 June – Josiah Wedgwood opens his Etruria Works for the manufacture of pottery.
 28 June – The Morning Chronicle newspaper begins publication in London.
 3 July – Richard Arkwright patents a spinning frame able to weave fabric mechanically.
 5–7 September – actor-manager David Garrick stages a Shakespeare Jubilee festival in Stratford-upon-Avon, disrupted by rain and with no performances of Shakespeare's works.
 7 October – James Cook reaches New Zealand.
 19 November – Blackfriars Bridge across the River Thames in London opens to traffic.

Undated
 Gordon's London dry gin first produced.
 Elizabeth Raffald's cookery book The Experienced English Housekeeper, published in Manchester, contains a recipe for "Bride Cake" covered in marzipan and royal icing that is recognisable as a modern wedding cake and the earliest printed recipe for crumpet.
 Work on Syon House, Middlesex, to the design of Robert Adam, ceases.
 Approximate date – Britannia metal is first produced, in Sheffield.

Publications
 Authorized King James Version of the Bible in the Oxford standard text edited by Benjamin Blayney.
 Debrett's Peerage and Baronetage first published as The New Peerage.
 William Robertson's The History of the Reign of Charles V.

Births
 1 January – Jane Marcet, science writer (died 1858)
 6 January – Lord Charles Townshend, Member of Parliament (died 1796)
 2 March – Walter Fawkes, writer and Member of Parliament (died 1825)
 4 March – Ellen Sharples, painter (died 1849)
 23 March – William Smith, geologist and cartographer (died 1839)
 3 April – Josiah Wedgwood II, Member of Parliament (died 1843)
 5 April – Sir Thomas Hardy, 1st Baronet, naval officer (died 1839)
 13 April – Thomas Lawrence, painter (died 1830)
 14 April – William Rae, Member of Parliament (died 1842)
 1 May – Arthur Wellesley, 1st Duke of Wellington, general and Prime Minister (died 1852)
 2 May – John Malcolm, soldier, statesman and historian (died 1833)
 21 May – John Hookham Frere, diplomat and author (died 1846)
 18 June – Viscount Castlereagh, statesman, diplomat, and soldier (died 1822)
 14 August – Richard Barry, 7th Earl of Barrymore, noble (died 1793)
 10 September – Charles Bullen, admiral (died 1853)
 19 September – George Raper, naval officer and illustrator (died 1797)
 28 September – John Jackson, boxer (died 1845)
 6 October – Isaac Brock, general and administrator (died 1812)
 23 October – James Ward, painter and engraver (died 1859)
 7 November – William Sturges Bourne, politician (died 1845)
 12 November – Amelia Opie, author (died 1853)
 13 December – James Scarlett Abinger, judge (died 1844)
 23 December
 William Henry Clinton, general (died 1846)
 Martin Archer Shee, portrait painter (died 1850)
 date unknown
 Maria Bland, singer (died 1838)
 Elizabeth Conyngham, Marchioness Conyngham, mistress of George IV (died 1861)
 James Dadford, English canal engineer (year of death unknown)
 Charles Ewart, soldier (died 1846)
 Francis Gore, officer and colonial administrator (died 1852)
 Robert Hetrick, poet (died 1849)

Deaths
 25 February – Henry Flitcroft, architect (born 1697)
 2 August – Daniel Finch, 8th Earl of Winchilsea, politician (born 1689)
 19 August – Matthew Brettingham, architect (born 1699)
 29 August – Edmond Hoyle, game expert (born 1672)

References

 
Years in Great Britain